The 1943 Navy Midshipmen football team represented the United States Naval Academy during the 1943 college football season. In their second season under head coach John Whelchel, the Midshipmen compiled an 8–1 record, shut out three opponents and outscored all opponents by a combined score of 237 to 80. Navy was ranked No. 4 in the final AP Poll.

Schedule

References

Navy
Navy Midshipmen football seasons
Lambert-Meadowlands Trophy seasons
Navy Midshipmen football